A splashdown is the landing of a spacecraft or satellite in a body of water.

Splashdown may also refer to:

 "Splashdown" (seaQuest DSV), the second season finale of seaQuest DSV
 Splashdown (band), a rock / trip hop band from Massachusetts
 Splashdown (video game), a 2001 console video game series (Splashdown and Splashdown: Rides Gone Wild) about racing jet-skis
 Splashdown (Hot Tuna album), 1984
 Splashdown (Breakwater album), 1980
 Splashdown Waterparks, two British water parks, Splashdown Poole and Splashdown Quaywest 
  Splashdown, an element on roller coasters
 Splashdown, a minor superhero from The Incredibles
 Splashdown (log flume)
 Splashdown (Transformers), a Transformers character

See also
 Water landing